Dolný Kubín (also known by other names) is a town in northern Slovakia in the Žilina Region. It is the historical capital and the largest settlement of the Orava region.

Names
The name is derived from the archaic Slovak word  meaning a "glade covered by smoke after burnt roots". Dolný Kubín means "Lower Kubín", in contrast with to Vyšný ("Upper") Kubín. The location and the settlement was known also as Kublen (1314), Clbin (1393), Culbyn (1408), Kubyn Nysny (1547), Dolny Kubin (1773). Other names in the past include , .

Geography
It is located in northern Slovakia on the Orava River, between the Lesser Fatra, Oravská Magura and Chočské vrchy mountains. The town is composed of the following boroughs: Banisko, Beňova Lehota, Brezovec, Kňažia, Malý Bysterec, Medzihradné, Mokraď, Srňacie, Staré mesto, Veľký Bysterec and Záskalie. The city limits also encompass the settlement of Jelšava.

Climate
The Köppen Climate Classification subtype for this climate is "Dfb" (Warm Summer Continental Climate).

History

The first written reference of the location dates from 1314 and is about the land (not the settlement yet) Kubín. In 1325, the existence of "Superior Kolbyn" (Vyšný Kubín) was recorded what could indicate also the existence of Dolný Kubín, more detailed information about the settlement are from 1380s. The settlement belonged to the Orava Castle and was the center for the neighboring settlements. The citizens lived by animal husbandry and hunting, but also by quarrying. It was granted town privileges (town status, town charter) in 1632, and its importance was further strengthened in 1633 when the town was granted the right to hold markets. In 1683 the town became the seat of the Orava county and in 1776 also the seat of a processus district. In the 19th century Dolný Kubín was a centre of Slovak national life and the poet Pavol Országh Hviezdoslav and other Slovak national revivalists were active in the town.

After World War I, Dolný Kubín remained the seat of the Orava County until 1923, when Orava became a part of Váh County and it became the seat of its district. During World War II, the local garrison actively participated in preparation of Slovak National Uprising. Between December 1944 and January 1945, the town suffered from  retaliatory actions and mass arrests. Red Army arrived to the town in the night from 4 to 5 April 1945, warmly welcomed by the local population.

The town experienced major developments mainly after World War II, when electrical works as well as other enterprises were established.

Landmarks and culture
The Gothic St. Catherine church was built in the 14th century. The Čaplovič Library, containing collection of newspapers, books, maps and other printed works from 15th to the 19th century, along with the P. O. Hviezdoslav Museum, is located in the town. The Orava Gallery focuses on the art works from the 15th century to the 20th century and is seated in the former County House from the 17th century. The premier Slovak competition in poetry and prose recitation, called Hviezdoslavov Kubín (Hviezdoslav's Kubín), has taken place in the town since 1954. Orava Castle is located a few kilometres north-east of the town, in the village of Oravský Podzámok.

Demographics
According to the 2001 census, the town had 19,948 inhabitants. 97.03% of inhabitants were Slovaks, 1.07% Czechs and 0.28% Roma. The religious make-up was 65.11% Roman Catholics, 16.62% Lutherans and 14.55% people with no religious affiliation.

Twin towns — sister cities

Dolný Kubín is twinned with:

 Braunau am Inn, Austria
 Eger, Hungary
 Kamianets-Podilskyi, Ukraine
 Limanowa, Poland
 Pakrac, Croatia
 Pelhřimov, Czech Republic
 Svendborg, Denmark
 Truskavets, Ukraine
 Zawiercie, Poland
 Erzsébetváros, Hungary

Personalities
Pavol Országh Hviezdoslav (1849–1921), Slovak poet, born in nearby Vyšný Kubín, but lived and died in Dolný Kubín.
Ladislav Nádaši-Jégé (1866–1940), Slovak author, born, lived and died in Dolný Kubín.
Janko Matúška (1821–1877), author of Slovakia's national anthem, was born, became clerk of the district court, and died in Dolný Kubín.
Juraj Laštík (b. 1987), Slovakian ski mountaineer
Ján Johanides (1934–2008), Slovak writer
Jaroslav Prílepok, contemporary composer and multi-instrumentalist, born in Dolný Kubín.
Soňa Stanovská, slalom canoeist, born 27 February 2000 in Dolný Kubín.

See also
 List of municipalities and towns in Slovakia

References

Genealogical resources

The records for genealogical research are available at the state archive "Statny Archiv in Bytca, Slovakia"

 Roman Catholic church records (births/marriages/deaths): 1672-1898 (parish A)
 Lutheran church records (births/marriages/deaths): 1787-1897 (parish A)

External links

 Official website
Surnames of living people in Dolny Kubin

Cities and towns in Slovakia